This article concerns the period 599 BC – 590 BC.

Events and trends
598 BC—Jeconiah succeeds Jehoiakim as King of Judah.
598 BC—Kamarina is founded in Sicily (traditional date).
March 16, 597 BC—Babylonians capture Jerusalem following a siege, replace Jeconiah with Zedekiah as king, and send many Jews (including Ezekiel) into Babylonian captivity.
595 BC—Psamtik II succeeds Necho II as king of Egypt.
595 BC—Beginning of the First Sacred War in ancient Greece.
595 BC—In Zhou Dynasty China, the State of Jin is defeated by the State of Chu in the Battle of Bi.
594 BC—The leaders of Athens, facing an economic crisis and popular discontent, appoint the poet–statesman Solon (eponymous archon) to institute democratic reforms and revive the city's constitution, extending citizenship to males of many classes and establishing the Ecclesia.
593 BC—Exile of Sappho and Alcaeus (Alkaios) of Mytilene in Sicily.
592 BC—Early history of Sudan: An Egyptian army sacks Napata, compelling the Cushite court to move to a more secure location at Meroë near the sixth cataract of the Nile.
590 BC—The Medians invade the Kingdom of Urartu, causing its fall.

Significant people
599 BC—Birth of Mahavira, the 24th Tirthankara of Jainism (died 527 BC)

References